Kingsland railway station may refer to:

 Kingsland railway station, Auckland, a station on the Western Line in Auckland, New Zealand
 Kingsland railway station (England), a former station in Kingsland, Herefordshire, England